Arden Fair is a two-level regional shopping mall located on Arden Way in Sacramento, California, United States. The mall is anchored by the traditional retailers Macy's and JCPenney in addition to featuring the premier specialty retailers Abercrombie & Fitch, Ann Taylor, Apple Store, Banana Republic, Coach, J Crew, Lululemon Athletica, Lucky Brand, M.A.C. Cosmetics, and White House Black Market. It is operated by the premier development firm Macerich.

History
Arden Fair was originally built in 1957 as a single-level outdoor mall with Sears as the original anchor, despite being physically separated from the rest of the mall. Hale's, the second original anchor, opened four years later in 1961, which was later converted to Weinstock's. By the 1970s, Arden Fair was converted into an indoor mall.

In 1989, a major structural renovation and physical face-lift occurred by Homart Development, which more than doubled the size of the mall. It added a second story, a food court and brought the first Nordstrom department store to Sacramento. The old Sears building was gutted as part of the expansion and Sears was relocated to a new building that finally connected the store to the mall. In 1994, JCPenney opened up as the mall's fourth anchor, replacing a United Artists movie theater that was relocated to Market Square at Arden Fair, an entertainment and retail complex next door to the mall. In 1996, Weinstock's was converted to the present-day Macy's as part of Federated Department Stores' (now Macy's, Inc.) acquisition of Broadway Stores, Inc in 1995.

In early 2004, KCRA-TV, the NBC affiliate in Sacramento, opened "The KCRA 3 Experience", an in-house studio that was located on the second floor of the mall where shoppers got a behind-the-scenes look of how a newscast was put together and a chance to be on TV. Over the years, Walt Gray, Patty Souza, Adrienne Bankert and Eileen Javora broadcast the news every Monday-Friday at Noon. KCRA discontinued the in-house studio and closed it in late 2008 and was replaced by a Verizon Wireless phone store.

The early 2020's saw several storied traditional department store retailers update its brick-and-mortar divisions after being disrupted by several digital retailers and the COVID pandemic in recent years.

On May 7, 2020, Nordstrom, which also currently maintains an additional regional outpost in nearby Roseville, announced plans to shutter along with several additional locations around this country as a direct result of pulling back because of the COVID-19 crisis, causing it to focus on its remainder highest achieving locations.
 
On January 29, 2021, Sears also announced it would shutter as part of an ongoing effort to phase out of their traditional brick-and-mortar divisions.

Several additional replacement tenants for each space are each reportedly in the midst of early on discussions.

As recently as January 2023, This mall remains as one of the top regional destinations and an important outpost for the entire Sacramento region.

References

External links
Arden Fair Official Site

Shopping malls established in 1957
Buildings and structures in Sacramento, California
Macerich
Economy of Sacramento, California
Shopping malls in Sacramento County, California
Tourist attractions in Sacramento, California